Marie Anne Éléonore Gabrielle de Bourbon (22 December 1690 – 30 August 1760) was a daughter of Louis III de Bourbon, Prince of Condé and Louise Françoise, Princess of Condé. She was the Abbess of Saint-Antoine-des-Champs, an abbey in the Villejuif suburb of Paris.

Biography

Marie Anne Éléonore was born at the Palace of Versailles to the Duke and Duchess of Bourbon. The eldest child of her parents she was known as Mademoiselle de Bourbon in her youth. In her early years she was close to her mother but was later replaced by her sister Louise Élisabeth de Bourbon. Her father, Louis III de Bourbon, was the grandson of le Grand Condé, and her mother, Louise-Françoise de Bourbon, was the eldest surviving daughter of Louis XIV of France and his maîtresse-en-titre, Madame de Montespan.

As a member of the reigning House of Bourbon, she was a princesse du sang ("princess of the blood") and was allowed the style of Serene Highness.

On 6 May 1706 at the age of 16, she was made a nun at the Royal Abbey of Fontevraud in Anjou. She was later made the Abbess of Saint-Antoine-des-Champs in 1723 and was known as Madame de Bourbon. Saint-Antoine-des-Champs had been an abbey since the 13th century. 

She outlived all of her siblings apart from her sister Dowager Princess of Conti and grand mother of the future Philippe Égalité. Dying in the Parisian suburb of Villejuif, she was buried at the Abbey of Saint-Antoine-des-Champs. 

Her sister Henriette Louise de Bourbon was an abbess at Beaumont-lès-Tours and a cousin Louise Adélaïde d'Orléans was the Abbess of Chelles. The Abbey at Saint-Antoine is now the home of the Hôpital Saint-Antoine outside Paris.

Ancestry

References 

Marie Anne Eleonore
Marie Anne Eleonore
18th-century French nuns
1690 births
1760 deaths
People from Versailles
French Roman Catholic abbesses